Hampshire Garden Apartment Buildings are historic structures located in the Petworth neighborhood in the Northwest quadrant of Washington, D.C.  They were listed on the National Register of Historic Places in 1994. It is also a D.C. Historic Landmark.

History
The buildings of the Hampshire Garden Apartments  compose the first fully developed garden apartment complex in the city, although only part of it was built.

The initial plan was for the complex to have 2,500 units, but the Great Depression brought construction to an end in 1929.  The complex was built as middle-class housing and was an early example of cooperative ownership.

The nine buildings occupy an entire block and surround an oval-shaped common lawn. They are all two stories tall and follow a cross-shaped plan.  Decorative elements in the Tudor revival style include half timbering, crenellated towers and entrances trimmed in carved stone.  The exteriors of the buildings were designed by James E. Cooper and George T. Santmyers designed the interiors.  Parks and Baxter served as the landscape architects.

References

Residential buildings completed in 1929
Apartment buildings in Washington, D.C.
Tudor Revival architecture in Washington, D.C.
Residential buildings on the National Register of Historic Places in Washington, D.C.